David Chen (born 29 January 1979), also known as Chen Yifei and Chen Yufan is a Taiwanese actor.

Personal life 
He married Chinese singer Tan Weiwei after proposing to her in 2016 during a trip to Mount Kailash. In 2018, they collaborated on a song for the TV series The Legend of Jade Sword which he acted in.

Filmography

Film

Series

References

External links 

1979 births
Living people
Taiwanese male film actors
Taiwanese male television actors
21st-century Taiwanese actors
University of California, Irvine alumni